The western gray squirrel (Sciurus griseus) is a tree squirrel found along the western coast of the United States and Mexico. In some places, this species has also been known as the silver-gray squirrel, the California gray squirrel, the Oregon gray squirrel, the Columbian gray squirrel and the banner-tail. There are three geographical subspecies: Sciurus griseus griseus (central Washington to the western Sierra Nevada in central California); S. g. nigripes (from south of San Francisco Bay to San Luis Obispo County, California); and S. g. anthonyi (which ranges from San Luis Obispo to northern Baja California).

In some landscapes, the western grey squirrel has lost habitat or experienced local extinction due to competition with other squirrel species  and other pressures on their population.

Description
The western gray squirrel was first described by George Ord in 1818 based on notes taken by Lewis and Clark at The Dalles in Wasco County, Oregon.

Sciurus griseus is the largest tree squirrel in the Sierra Nevada and Central California range. It has plantigrade, pentadactyl feet with two phalanges. Compared with the eastern gray squirrel S. carolinensis or the fox squirrel S. niger (which have been introduced into its native range), these squirrels are shy, and will generally run up a tree and give a hoarse chirping call when disturbed. It is the largest native tree squirrel in the western coastal United States. Western gray squirrels exhibit a form of coloration known as counter shading. The dorsal fur is a silver gunmetal gray, with pure white on the underside; there may be black flecks in the tail. Ears are large but without tufts. The ears turn reddish-brown at the back in the winter. The tail is long and typically very bushy. Also, it stays in a curved upwards in an "S" shape.

Tree squirrels undergo a complete head-to-tail molt in the spring and a rump-to-head molt in the fall. Tail hair is replaced only in the spring. Nesting mothers will use their tail hair to line birthing nests. Western gray squirrels eat berries, nuts, a variety of seeds, and the eggs of small birds.

Reproduction
Western gray squirrels reach sexual maturity at 10 to 11 months, and at approximately one year of age, will begin breeding.  They mate over an extended period ranging from December through June. Young are born after approximate 44-day gestation period. Juveniles emerge from nests between March and mid-August. Litter sizes range from one to five kits which remain in the nest for a longer period than other squirrels. The kits are relatively slow in development, and will not leave the nest for six months or more, another species disadvantage when in competition with other, more-rapidly fledging squirrels. Young gray squirrels have furled tails which will not reach fullness until adulthood. This is a good indicator of age and maturity. Mother squirrels often seem to be overworked with a stressed appearance, complete with bruised and battered nipples. Mating squirrels can be very physical and will bite and injure each other. Females can be quite territorial, and will chase others away and have fairly violent altercations between themselves.

Behavior and diet
Western gray squirrels are forest dwellers, and can be found at elevations up to 2,000 m. Time on the ground is spent foraging, but they prefer to travel distances from tree to tree. They are strictly diurnal, and feed mainly on seeds and nuts, particularly pine seeds and acorns, though they will also take berries, fungus and insects.  Pine nuts and acorns are considered critical foods because they are very high in oil and moderately high in carbohydrates, which help increase the development of body fat. They feed mostly in trees and on the ground. They generally forage in the morning and late afternoon for acorns, pine nuts, new tree buds, and fruits. They feed on pinecones and many other nuts in preparation for the winter.

When on alert, they will spread their tails lavishly, creating an umbrella effect that shields them and possibly provides cover from overhead predators. They are scatter-hoarders making numerous caches of food when it is abundant, and thus contribute to the seed dispersion of their food trees. Although squirrels show relatively good scent relocation abilities, some food caches are never reclaimed, becoming seedlings in the spring. Though they do not hibernate, they do become less active during the winter. Like many prey animals, they depend on auditory alerts from other squirrels or birds to determine safety. Once an alarm call is transmitted, those present will join in, and the trees become a cacophony of chirping squirrels. Western gray squirrels squirrels are prey for hawks, eagles, bobcats, cougars, coyotes, raccoons, cats, dogs and humans.

Habitat and shelter

Squirrel nests are called dreys and can be seen in trees, built from sticks and leaves wrapped with long strands of grass. There are two stick nest types made by the western gray squirrel: the first is a large, round, covered shelter nest for winter use, birthing, and rearing young. The second is more properly termed a "sleeping platform," a base for seasonal or temporary use. Both types are built with sticks and twigs and are lined with leaves, moss, lichens and shredded bark. The birthing nest may be lined with tail hair. Young or traveling squirrels will also "sleep rough" when weather permits, balanced spread-eagled on a tree limb high above the forest floor. This attitude is also adopted for cooling in hot weather, a behavior also observed in raccoons.

The western gray squirrel is an arboreal species, requiring enough tree cover for arboreal travel. It resides in woody areas to build their complex nests. It lives in high and low elevations in California and finds habitats in both walnut trees and black oak trees.

The western gray squirrel has many predators, including red-tailed hawks (Buteo jamaicensis), great horned owls (Bubo virginianus), eagles (Accipitridae), bobcats (Lynx rufus), coyotes (Canis latrans), cougars (Puma concolor), domestic cats (Felis catus) and domestic dogs (Canis familiaris). However, the predation does not control the squirrel's population density.

Habitat loss and competition
The western gray squirrel was listed as a threatened species in Washington state in 1993. Populations of the western gray squirrel have not recovered from past reductions. They are threatened with habitat loss, road-kill mortality and disease. Habitat has been lost due to urbanization, catastrophic wild fires, and areas of forest degraded by fire suppression and overgrazing, allowing the invasion of scotch broom. Notoedric mange, a disease caused by mites, becomes epidemic in western gray squirrel populations and is a major source of mortality. Other species, such as eastern gray squirrels, fox squirrels, California ground squirrels and wild turkeys are expanding and competing with the western gray squirrel.

Listed as extirpated in some California areas, the western gray squirrel in southern California is generally found only in the mountains and surrounding foothill communities. Local rehabilitation experts recount that fox squirrels were released in urban regions of Los Angeles throughout the 20th century. Fox squirrels (Sciurus niger) were introduced to the Los Angeles area in about 1904. Civil War and Spanish–American War veterans residing at the Sawtelle Veterans Home on Sepulveda and Wilshire Boulevards brought fox squirrels as pets to this site from their homes in the areas surrounding the Mississippi Valley (possibly Tennessee). Other introductions of fox squirrels to the Los Angeles area may have taken place during more recent times, but detailed records are not available. These aggressive cousins drove the more reclusive western gray squirrels back into the mountains, where competition was not so strong. This non-native species introduction appears to be the largest threat in the southern California area.

See also

Fox squirrel
Eastern gray squirrel
California ground squirrel

References

 
 Hogan, C.Michael. Sciurus griseus (Western gray squirrel). GlobalTwitcher. N. Stromberg (ed.).

External links

 Report of an investigation into locally endangered status containing a comprehensive review of the species' natural history
 Smithsonian Western Gray Squirrel article

Western gray squirrel
Mammals of Mexico
Mammals of the United States
Rodents of North America
Fauna of California
Fauna of the California chaparral and woodlands
Fauna of the Sierra Nevada (United States)
Mammals described in 1818
Least concern biota of North America
Taxa named by George Ord